Sarawal is a Rural municipality located within the Parasi District of the Lumbini Province of Nepal.
The rural municipality spans  of area, with a total population of 38,163 according to a 2011 Nepal census.

On March 10, 2017, the Government of Nepal restructured the local level bodies into 753 new local level structures.
The previous Sarawal, Tilakpur, Manari, Badahara Dubauliya, Rampur Khadauna and Bhujhawa VDCs were merged to form Sarawal Rural Municipality.
Sarawal is divided into 7 wards, with Sarawal VDC declared the administrative center of the rural municipality.

References

External links
official website of the rural municipality

Rural municipalities in Parasi District
Rural municipalities of Nepal established in 2017